The participation of Latvia in Eurovision Choir began in Riga, Latvia, at the Eurovision Choir of the Year 2017. Latvijas Televīzija (LTV) a member organisation of the European Broadcasting Union (EBU) are responsible for the selection process of their participants, for their debut in 2017. Spīgo was the first representative to participate for the nation at the 2017 edition after winning the national selection show entitled Latvija Dzied (Latvia Sings) on 29 April 2017.

Origins of the event 
The Eurovision Choir of the Year is a new event being launched by the EBU, and the latest event to be launched since the Eurovision Magic Circus Show. The event will consist of non-professional choirs who are members of the EBU, with the inaugural contest scheduled to take place on 22 July 2017, hosted by the Latvian broadcaster Latvijas Televīzija (LTV), and to coincide with the closing ceremony of the European Choir Games 2017. The event will be officially confirmed on 30 November 2016 depending on a reasonable amount of interest from active members of the European Broadcasting Union.

History
The European Broadcasting Union (EBU) announced on 8 August 2016 that they were going to develop a new show to join the existing Eurovision Family of Events. The event was officially confirmed on 30 November 2016, with Latvia chosen to host the inaugural event scheduled to take place on 22 July 2017. 

On 14 February 2017, it was confirmed that the inaugural contest would take place at the Arena Riga, located in the Latvian capital. The arena is primarily used for ice hockey, basketball and concerts. Riga Arena holds a maximum of 14,500 and was completed in 2006. It was built to be used as one of the venues for the 2006 IIHF World Championship, the other being Skonto Arena. It has been home to the Kontinental Hockey League club Dinamo Riga since 2008. During the years the Arena has also hosted many well-known artists from all over the world. The arena hosted the 'D' group of Eurobasket 2015.

A national selection show entitled Latvija Dzied (Latvia Sings), took place on 29 April 2017, in which the choir who will represent the host country, Latvia, was be chosen. The young female choral group Spīgo, conducted by Līga Celma–Kursiete, won the national selection.

Participation overview 
Table key

Broadcasts

Commentators
The contests are broadcast online worldwide through the official Eurovision Choir of the Year website eurovisionchoir.tv and YouTube. The Latvian broadcaster, LTV, will send their own commentator to each contest in order to provide commentary in the Latvian language.

Hostings

See also
Latvia in the Eurovision Song Contest – Senior version of the Junior Eurovision Song Contest.
Latvia in the Eurovision Young Dancers – A competition organised by the EBU for younger dancers aged between 16 and 21.
Latvia in the Eurovision Young Musicians – A competition organised by the EBU for musicians aged 18 years and younger.
Latvia in the Junior Eurovision Song Contest – Singing contest for children aged between 9 and 14.

References

External links
 

Latvia
Latvian music